Adejuyigbe is a Nigerian surname. Notable people with the surname include:

 Adekunle Adejuyigbe, Nigerian filmmaker and producer
 Demi Adejuyigbe (born 1992), American writer, comedian, and social media personality
 Kunle Adejuyigbe (born 1977), Nigerian sprinter

Surnames of Nigerian origin